Vacchiano Farm is a winery in the Port Colden section of Washington Township in Warren County, New Jersey, United States. A family produce and livestock farm since 1983, the vineyard was first planted in 2004, and began to sell its wine in 2009. Vacchiano has 11 acres of grapes under cultivation, and produces 2,500 cases of wine per year.

Wines and other products
Vacchiano Farm is in the Warren Hills AVA, and produces red and white wines from American hybrid grapes. Vacchiano also makes and sells breads, cheeses, fruits, meats, pies, sauces, and vegetables.

Licensing, associations, and distribution
Vacchiano has a plenary winery license from the New Jersey Division of Alcoholic Beverage Control, which allows it to produce an unrestricted amount of wine, operate up to 15 off-premises sales rooms, and ship up to 12 cases per year to consumers in-state or out-of-state. The winery is not a member of the Garden State Wine Growers Association. Vacchiano does not have a tasting room, but distributes their wines and other products at farmers' markets in New Jersey.

See also 
Alcohol laws of New Jersey
American wine
Judgment of Princeton
List of wineries, breweries, and distilleries in New Jersey
New Jersey Farm Winery Act
New Jersey Wine Industry Advisory Council
New Jersey wine

References 

Wineries in New Jersey
Tourist attractions in Warren County, New Jersey
2009 establishments in New Jersey
Washington Township, Warren County, New Jersey